Henry Greathead Rex Mason  (3 June 1885 – 2 April 1975) was a New Zealand politician. He served as Attorney General, Minister of Justice, Minister of Education, and Minister of Native Affairs, and had a significant influence on the direction of the Labour Party. He served in parliament from 1926 to 1966, the only person to serve as an MP for over 40 years.

Early life
Mason was born in Wellington on 3 June 1885. His father was Harry Brooks Mason, a compositor at the Government Printing Works (who worked for Hansard for a time) from South Africa. His mother, Henrietta Emma Rex, was an Australian who helped form the Women's Social and Political League and was vice-president in 1894. She also taught ballroom dancing in Wellington prior to World War I.

Mason was educated at Clyde Quay School, then Wellington College where he was dux in 1902. He won a scholarship and attended Victoria University where graduated in 1907 with a Master of Arts with honours in mathematics and a Bachelor of Laws. He then worked in several law firms in Wellington and Eltham before opening his own practice in Pukekohe in 1911. He was soon joined in the practice by his brother Spencer, who later became president of the Auckland District Law Society.

On 27 December 1912 Mason married Dulcia Martina Rockell at Auckland. Together they had two sons and two daughters. Through his wife's influence, Mason become interested in Indian religion and spirituality, and beliefs derived from it (particularly Theosophy). He was a vegetarian and a teetotaller.

Political career

Mason was elected Mayor of Pukekohe in 1915. He was left-wing in his political outlook, and joined the Labour Party on its foundation in 1916. In the 1919 general election, he was Labour's candidate for the seat of Manukau, but was defeated. Later, he shifted his attention to the seat of Eden — he contested it in the 1922 election and 1925 election. He finally won Eden in a 1926 by-election, assisted by the fact that the Reform Party's vote was split by a defeated nominee, Ellen Melville.

Rex Mason represented the seat of Eden in the 22nd parliament (1926–28), Auckland Suburbs in the 23rd to 27th parliaments (1928–46), Waitakere in the 28th to 33rd parliaments (1946–63), and New Lynn in the 34th parliament (1963–66).

In both 1931 and 1933 he stood unsuccessfully for Mayor of Auckland City on a Labour Party ticket, defeated by George Hutchison on both occasions.

Throughout his parliamentary career, Mason remained highly involved in the organisation of the Labour Party. He served as its president from 1931 to 1933, and played a major role in policy formulation. Mason was regarded as a social democrat rather than a socialist, and he played a part in moving the Labour Party closer to the political centre. He did, however, believe that the state should have exclusive control over the country's financial system, influenced by social credit monetary reform theories. Other causes supported by Mason include the establishment of a comprehensive old-age pension system and the granting of full state services to naturalised immigrants (the latter making him extremely popular with his electorate's substantial Yugoslavian community).

In 1935, Mason was awarded the King George V Silver Jubilee Medal.

First Labour government
When Labour won the 1935 general election, Mason became Attorney General and Minister of Justice, reflecting his legal background. When disputes arose between the party leadership and John A. Lee's more radical faction, Mason remained on good terms with both sides — while he sympathised with some of Lee's points, particularly regarding monetary reform, he did not join Lee's breakaway Democratic Labour Party (DLP). Mason later served as Minister of Education (where he worked closely with C. E. Beeby to implement educational reforms) and as Minister of Native Affairs. In 1941 the Public Service Commissioner Thomas Mark died in (or just outside) the minister's office, during a confrontation with Mason who wanted the resignation of the head of a department.

The chief justice, Michael Myers, was of the view that the Crown's principal law officers should be King's Counsel. On 23 July 1946, Mason (who was Minister of Justice) and Herbert Evans (who was solicitor-general received their appointment. Mason was not returned to Cabinet after the 1946 election, but returned to fill a vacancy the following year. After Labour lost office, he continued to agitate on a number of issues, notably decimal currency.

Opposition
In 1953 Mason was among several Labour MPs who attempted an abortive coup to remove the 71-year-old Walter Nash as party leader, others included Bill Anderton and Arnold Nordmeyer. Mason informed Nash that several members were complaining about the party's leadership to him, and that he thought that the majority wanted to have a new leader. By 1954 a majority of the caucus was in favour of leadership change but pressure from the unions and continued support from Party branches allowed Nash to survive the subsequent caucus vote.

Second Labour government
After Labour won the 1957 election, Mason returned to his previous roles of Attorney General and Minister of Justice. He was also made Minister of Health.

In 1959 he introduced a bill proposing that men convicted of homosexual acts should be dealt with as merely indecent assaults and therefore carry a lighter penalty. Mason was unfairly and inaccurately accused of attempting to amend the law to legalise homosexual acts between consenting males and adopt the recommendations of the 1957 Wolfenden Report on homosexuality in England which was not the case. In 1961 National's deputy leader Jack Marshall was to retract much of his party's criticism claiming they had misunderstood the intention of the bill.

Later career

Mason eventually retired from politics at the 1966 election, under a certain amount of pressure from colleagues who wished to "rejuvenate" the Labour Party. Mason was now in his eighties. Two years earlier he had broken Āpirana Ngata's record for the longest consecutive service in parliament and Maurice O'Rorke's record for the longest overall service in parliament. He is the only person to have served as an MP for over 40 years.

He was invited by new Prime Minister Norman Kirk as a guest of honour to the first meeting of caucus following Labour's victory in the 1972 election where he oversaw the election of the cabinet.

In the 1967 New Year Honours, Mason was appointed a Companion of the Order of St Michael and St George, for public services.

Death
Mason died in Wellington on 2 April 1975, aged 89, and his ashes were buried in Karori Cemetery.

Mason Street in his home electorate of New Lynn is named after him.

Notes

References

|-

|-

|-

|-

|-

|-

|-

|-

|-

|-

|-

1885 births
1975 deaths
People from Wellington City
Attorneys-General of New Zealand
People educated at Wellington College (New Zealand)
Mayors of places in the Auckland Region
Members of the Cabinet of New Zealand
New Zealand Labour Party MPs
20th-century New Zealand lawyers
Victoria University of Wellington alumni
New Zealand education ministers
Members of the New Zealand House of Representatives
New Zealand MPs for Auckland electorates
New Zealand King's Counsel
Unsuccessful candidates in the 1919 New Zealand general election
Unsuccessful candidates in the 1922 New Zealand general election
Unsuccessful candidates in the 1925 New Zealand general election
New Zealand Companions of the Order of St Michael and St George
Burials at Karori Cemetery
Justice ministers of New Zealand